Sarov (also, Musul’man Sarov, Musulman-Zarov, and Musurman-Sarov) is a village and municipality in the Tartar Rayon of Azerbaijan.  It has a population of 1,495. The municipality consists of the villages of Sarov, Bildirçinli and Umudlu.

References 

Populated places in Tartar District